Roosky, Ruskey, or Rooskey is a village on the River Shannon in the northern midlands of Ireland, near the point where counties Leitrim, Longford, and Roscommon meet. The N4 road from Dublin to Sligo passes by the Leitrim side of the village.

History 
In 1798 the local rebels defeated the army of General Lake on the shores of Lough Bofin as part of the 1798 rebellion. There was also a 'Pleasure House' on the shores of the same lake, including a man-made beach only accessible to people from the Anglo-Irish Protestant class, which was later burned down. The Protestant church, in the centre of the village, was also attacked at this time.

Roosky was a lively market village in the mid 20th Century. The bridge was the scene of conflict during the Irish Civil War in 1922 and was also an important focal point for the National Farmers Association strike in 1967.

The portion of the village in County Leitrim was formerly known as Georgia or Gorteenoran and constituted 5 houses and three licensed premises in 1925. This name is not in use today.

Facilities 
Our Lady of Mount Carmel, the Roman Catholic church built in 1844, holds regular masses. The village has a supermarket, a Chinese restaurant, a Garda Station and a number of pubs. The community centre is located on the site of the old primary school.

Culture 
The Shannon Key West Hotel was an entertainment venue in the village, until it went into liquidation, closing its doors on 18 October 2011. Every year, the village holds the 'Rooskey Heritage Festival,' usually in July.

Tourism 
Roosky is a destination for anglers, as the River Shannon and the nearby loughs are well stocked with coarse fish including roach, perch and bream. The harbour and marina are especially busy in the summer, with cruise vessels regularly stopping here.

The Rooskey Heritage Festival is also held annually in the village. This community festival includes live music and heritage displays and promotes Rooskey village as a tourist destination. There are also art exhibitions, watersport displays and markets. Proceeds raised by the festival go towards the next year's festival and community projects which have included commissioning a wooden sculpture for the village, promoting the village's rich history by using plaques near points of interest and organising events all year celebrating heritage.

Outdoor activities that take place locally include watersports, horse-riding, pony-trekking and walking.

Education 
The village is served by the local primary school, Our Lady of Mount Carmel N.S., which was opened in 1997.

Industry 
On 8 May 2002, a fire destroyed much of the premises of the Glanbia pork processing plant. Furthermore, the following year it was announced that the plant would not be rebuilt. On the Leitrim side of the village, there is also a test tube making factory.

Rail access
The nearest railway station is located on the County Leitrim side of the River Shannon at Dromod which is on the Dublin–Sligo railway line.

Sport 
Roosky is represented in both GAA and soccer by Kilglass Gaels and Dynamo Rooskey, respectively. 

There are three 18-hole golf courses in the area.

People 
Albert Reynolds, politician and 9th Taoiseach of Ireland, born in Roosky.

See also 
 List of towns and villages in Ireland

References

External links

Towns and villages in County Roscommon
Towns and villages in County Leitrim
Populated places on the River Shannon